Vələçola (also, Vela-Chela and Velechola) is a village in the Lerik Rayon of Azerbaijan.

References 

Populated places in Lerik District